John Evan Richards (July 7, 1856 – June 25, 1932) was an American attorney who served as an associate justice of the California Supreme Court from 1924 until 1932.

Biography
Richards was born on July 7, 1856, to Richard Evan Richards and Mary Hamilton in San Jose, California, where he attended the public schools. He obtained his undergraduate degree from University of the Pacific in 1877 and his law degree from the University of Michigan Law School in 1879.

After graduation, Richards practiced law in San Francisco and San Jose with the firm of Moore, Lane & Leib, where future Justice William Langdon was later employed as a law clerk. In January 1904, Richards was elected a trustee of the newly formed Santa Clara Bar Association.

In September 1907, Governor James Gillett appointed Richards as judge of the Santa Clara Superior Court to fill the vacancy from the resignation due to age of Augustus Rhodes.

In October 1913, Governor Hiram Johnson elevated Richards to the First District Court of Appeal, replacing Samuel P. Hall who died in office. In October 1914, Richards won election to the remainder of Hall's unexpired term. From 1913 to 1916, he lectured at Santa Clara University School of Law.

On February 11, 1924, Governor Friend Richardson appointed Richards as an associate justice of the California Supreme Court to fill the vacant seat of Frank H. Kerrigan. In November 1924, Richards won election to the remainder of Kerrigan's unexpired term. His last opinion, Parra v. Traeger (1931) was filed on December 31, 1931. He died in office on June 25, 1932. Governor James Rolph appointed Ira F. Thompson to take the vacant seat.

Honors and activities
Richards served as a trustee of the University of the Pacific, which in 1914 awarded him an honorary Master of Arts. In 1924, the University of Michigan conferred on him the honorary degree of Doctor of Laws. In his spare time, he wrote editorials, essays and poetry.

Personal life
On November 3, 1881, Richards married Mary Westphal in San Jose, California. They had two sons: John P. Richards and Donald W. Richards.

See also
 List of justices of the Supreme Court of California

References

External links
 John E. Richards In Memoriam. 215 Cal. Rpts. 777 (1932). California Supreme Court Historical Society. Retrieved July 18, 2017.
 Past & Present Justices. California State Courts. Retrieved July 19, 2017.
 Past & Present Justices. California Court of Appeal, First District. Retrieved July 25, 2017.

1856 births
1932 deaths
University of the Pacific (United States) alumni
University of Michigan Law School alumni
People from San Jose, California
Justices of the Supreme Court of California
People from Alameda County, California
California State University alumni
Superior court judges in the United States
Lawyers from San Francisco
20th-century American judges
20th-century American lawyers
California Republicans